Saddle Tramp is a 1950 American Western film directed by Hugo Fregonese and starring Joel McCrea and Wanda Hendrix. Its uncredited theme song was "The Cry of the Wild Goose" by Frankie Laine.

Plot
While travelling through Nevada enroute to California, "saddle tramp" Chuck Conner stays overnight with an old close friend. After the friend is killed falling from his horse, "Uncle Chuck" feels a duty to look after his four young boys, whose mother had died previously. He takes a job on a local ranch, but must conceal his new family from his employer. He also takes in a young woman who has run away from home, and she assists him to tackle a gang of cattle rustlers.

Cast
Joel McCrea as Chuck Conner
Wanda Hendrix as Della
John Russell as Rocky
John McIntire as Jess Higgins
Jeanette Nolan as Ma Higgins
Russell Simpson as Pop
Ed Begley as Mr. August Hartnagle
Jimmy Hunt as Robbie
Orley Lindgren as Tommie
Gordon Gebert as Johnnie
Gregory Moffett as Butch
Antonio Moreno as Martinez
John Ridgely as Slim
Walter Coy as Mr Phillips
Joaquin Garay as Pancho
Peter Leeds as Springer
Michael Steele as Orvie
Paul Picerni as  Denver

References

Bibliography
Nott, Robert. Last of the Cowboy Heroes: The Westerns of Randolph Scott, Joel McCrea, and Audie Murphy. McFarland, 2005.

External links

1950 films
American historical films
American Western (genre) films
1950s historical films
1950 Western (genre) films
1950s English-language films
Films directed by Hugo Fregonese
Universal Pictures films
Films set in Nevada
Films set in the 19th century
1950s American films